Humphreyville is a populated place situated in East Fallowfield Township in Chester County, Pennsylvania, United States.

References

Unincorporated communities in Chester County, Pennsylvania
Unincorporated communities in Pennsylvania